The Slavia Melbourne Soccer Club is a defunct Australian association football (soccer) club that was based in Melbourne, Victoria. The club was founded in 1950 by Czech migrants and became a leading club in Australian football. Slavia competed in the Victorian State League from 1956 to 1970 and 1973 to 1980. Through its history the club went by a number of names, starting out as Slavia, then Port Melbourne Slavia, Essendon Slavia and finally Prahran Slavia.

The golden era of the club was in the 1960s where the club won many titles, most notably the Australian Cup in 1963. The club never won the Victorian State league, finishing Runner-Up on two occasions in 1966 and 1977. For the 1967-68 season, the club incredibly signed the former Czechoslovakian national goalkeeper, Viliam Schrojf, who had starred with the national team in the 1962 World Cup (albeit was at fault for his role in losing the 1962 World Cup Final vs Brazil).

By the 1980s the club had fallen on hard times and in 1983 the club ceased to exist when it was taken over by the Chilean community, today known as the Laverton Park Soccer Club.

Honours

National
 Australian Cup
Winners (1): 1963

State
 Ampol Cup
Winners (1): 1967
 Dockerty Cup
Winners (3): 1964, 1965, 1967
Runner's Up (1): 1966
 Victorian First Tier
Runner's Up (2): 1966, 1977
 Victorian Second Tier
Premierships (2): 1955, 1972
 Victorian Third Tier
Premierships (1): 1954
 Victorian Fourth Tier
Premierships (1): 1953

References

Defunct soccer clubs in Australia
Association football clubs established in 1950
Soccer clubs in Melbourne
Association football clubs disestablished in 1983
1950 establishments in Australia
1983 disestablishments in Australia
European-Australian culture
Diaspora sports clubs in Australia